Mary Jane O'Reilly  (born 23 July 1950) is a New Zealand dancer and choreographer. She is best known for co-founding the Limbs Dance Company and the Auckland Dance Company, and choreographing the opening ceremony for the 1990 Commonwealth Games and the millennium dawn celebrations at Gisborne.

Career
During her career, O'Reilly has held positions including:
 Artistic director, Limbs Dance Company (1977–1989)
 Director of choreography, Commonwealth Games, Auckland (1989–1990)
 Advisor to QEII Arts Council (1991–1992)
 Artistic director, Auckland Dance Company (1996–2001)
 Governor, Arts Foundation of New Zealand (1999–2004)
 Senior lecturer in dance at the University of Auckland (2001–2004)
 Artistic director, TEMPO Festival of Dance (2006–2011)
 Artistic director, Living Room Festival (2012)

Her students have included Mark Baldwin and Douglas Wright.

Honours and awards
In 1984, O'Reilly received the Allen Highet Award for outstanding achievement by a mid-career artist. In the 1990 Queen's Birthday Honours, she received the Queens Service Medal for public services.

References

External links 
 Profile at Independancenz
 Personal website
 Personal 'Dance Diary'

1950 births
Living people
New Zealand female dancers
New Zealand choreographers
20th-century New Zealand dancers
21st-century New Zealand dancers
Academic staff of the University of Auckland
Recipients of the Queen's Service Medal